Easter witches ('easter hag', 'easter witch', Finland , 'easter witch', Finland , 'Trulli') is an old Swedish legend about witches flying to Blockula (Blå Jungfrun) on brooms on the Thursday before Easter (Maundy Thursday, :sv:Skärtorsdagen) or on the night between the Wednesday (Holy Wednesday, :sv:Dymmelonsdag) and Thursday before, and returning on Easter. In modern times children dress up as witches, old ladies or in old men's clothing and go door to door distributing greetings and often receiving treats in return.

Witch persecutions
In the 1600s, fear of witches caused persecution and trials. More than 200 women were tortured to death in Sweden. The last witch was sentenced in 1704 but it was not until 1779 that the death penalty for witchcraft was repealed. Because of this during this time period doors and dampers were secured to guard against the travel of the witches to Blåkulla to meet the Devil. Any tools the witches could use on their trip were put away on Maundy Thursday. Barn doors were secured to prevent the witches from milking or riding the animals.

Modern times
In Sweden and Finland, it is an Easter tradition for children to dress as witches, old women and old men and go door to door for treats similar to the trick-or-treating tradition of Halloween on Maundy Thursday or the day before Easter (Holy Saturday). The children sometimes present hand-made cards and other greetings. Related to warding off witchcraft and at a similar time of year is the Walpurgis Night celebration.

Image gallery

References

External links

Swedish folklore
Christian mythology
Easter traditions
Social history of Sweden
17th century in Sweden
Witchcraft in folklore and mythology
Witchcraft in Sweden